HMS Holmes has been the name of more than one ship of the British Royal Navy, and may refer to:

 , a frigate in commission from 1944 to 1945 briefly named Holmes while under construction in 1943
 , a frigate in commission from 1944 to 1945

Royal Navy ship names